is a Japanese fencer. He competed in the individual and team épée events at the 1964 Summer Olympics.

References

External links
 

1942 births
Living people
People from Hokkaido
Sportspeople from Hokkaido
Japanese male épée fencers
Olympic fencers of Japan
Fencers at the 1964 Summer Olympics
Asian Games medalists in fencing
Fencers at the 1978 Asian Games
Asian Games gold medalists for Japan
Asian Games silver medalists for Japan
Medalists at the 1978 Asian Games
20th-century Japanese people
21st-century Japanese people